Dédalo (Spanish for Daedalus) was the first Spanish aircraft carrier and the second aviation ship in the Spanish Navy (after the seaplane tender and balloon ship Dédalo that took part in the landings at Al Hoceima in 1925). She remained the fleet's flagship until Príncipe de Asturias replaced her. Dédalo was formerly the World War II-era light aircraft carrier USS Cabot, which was acquired from the United States in the 1960s.

History

In 1967, after over twelve years in mothballs in the United States, Cabot was loaned to Spain. The loan was converted to a sale in 1972. Dédalo initially deployed with the Spanish Navy as a helicopter-only antisubmarine warfare carrier operating the SH-3D Sea King and other helicopters from 1967 to 1976.

On 8 November 1972, a Harrier was successfully tested on the Dédalo deck, a first in the history of the plane.
It was decided to order and deploy short-take-off-and-vertical-landing (STOVL) AV-8S Matadors (AV-8A Harrier) when Dédalo was overhauled.  Since the Harriers' downdraft on vertical landing would have damaged the wooden deck, protective metal sheathing was installed on the rear area of the flight deck. The first batch of six AV-8S single seat and two TAV-8S two seat aircraft were delivered to the Armada Española throughout 1976. A second batch of four AV-8S aircraft was delivered in 1980.  Unlike some carriers used for Harrier operations, a ski-jump to assist STOVL takeoff was never installed on Dédalo, limiting the maximum takeoff weight of the Harriers.

She then typically carried an air group of eight AV-8S fighters, four Sea King antisubmarine warfare helicopters and four AB 212ASW Twin Hueys although Sikorsky S-55/CH-19s, AH-1 Cobras, and other specialized helicopters from the Spanish army, air force, and navy flew from her flight deck.

During her Spanish service, Dédalo logged 1,650 days steaming, covering , registering 30,000 landings and takeoffs, losing an AV-8A and three AB 212ASW helicopters to accidents.

Disposal
Replaced by the Spanish-built S/VTOL carrier Príncipe de Asturias in 1988, the Dédalo was struck by the Spanish Navy in August 1989, and she was given to a private organization in the U.S. for use as a museum ship. However, that private organization was unable to pay its creditors, and on 10 September 1999, the ship was auctioned off by the United States Marshals Service to Sabe Marine Salvage of Rockport, Texas. The scrapping of the hulk was completed in 2002.

See also
 List of aircraft carriers

References

External links

Independence-class aircraft carriers
Ships built in New Jersey
1943 ships
Aircraft carriers of the Spanish Navy
Ships transferred from the United States Navy to the Spanish Navy